Den Atelier is an indoor music venue in Luxembourg City, in southern Luxembourg.  It is located in Hollerich, and holds up to 1,200 people.  The name is an amalgam of Luxembourg's two main languages: 'den' being Luxembourgish for 'the' and 'atelier' being French for 'workshop'. The venue is located in a former Renault truck garage.

The idea to found Den Atelier was motivated by the fact that in the 1990s there was no place in Luxembourg that showcased international Rock, Alternative Rock and Indie bands. The idea was to create a space similar to the Ancienne Belgique in Brussels, Paradiso in Amsterdam or the Bataclan in Paris.

Since being founded in 1995, it has hosted a number of world-famous headlining acts, including Amy Macdonald, Stefanie Heinzmann, Arctic Monkeys, Tori Amos (twice), Blue October, Blondie (twice), Garbage (thrice) Avril Lavigne, The Corrs, Cyndi Lauper, Good Charlotte, Megadeth (twice), Motörhead, Muse, The Libertines, Wolfmother, My Chemical Romance, Simple Plan, Queens of the Stone Age (twice), Razorlight, The Smashing Pumpkins, and Brandon Flowers.

Footnotes

External links
 Den Atelier official website

Music venues in Luxembourg City